Ronde van Noord-Holland is a road bicycle race held annually in the province of North Holland (Noord-Holland) in the Netherlands. In 2005 the race was organized as a 1.1 event on the UCI Europe Tour. From 2006 to 2018, it was rated as a 1.2 event.

Winners

References

External links

UCI Europe Tour races
Recurring sporting events established in 1946
1946 establishments in the Netherlands
Cycle races in the Netherlands
Sports competitions in North Holland